Heat lightning, also known as silent lightning, summer lightning, or dry lightning (not to be confused with dry thunderstorms, which are also often called dry lightning), is a misnomer used for the faint flashes of lightning on the horizon or other clouds from distant thunderstorms that do not appear to have accompanying sounds of thunder.

The actual phenomenon that is sometimes called heat lightning is simply cloud-to-ground lightning that occurs very far away, with thunder that dissipates before it reaches the observer. In the United States, lightning is especially common in Florida, which is considered the deadliest state for lightning strikes in the country. This is due to high moisture content in the lower atmosphere and high surface temperature, which produces strong sea breezes along the Florida coast. As a result, heat lightning is often seen over the water at night, the remnants of storms that formed during the day along a sea breeze front coming in from the opposite coast.

Heat lightning is not to be confused with electrically induced luminosity actually generated at mesospheric altitudes above thunderstorm systems (and likewise visible at exceedingly great ranges), a phenomenon known as "sprites".

Cloud-to-ground lightning
The movement of sound in the atmosphere depends on the properties of the air, such as temperature and density. Because temperature and density change with height, the sound of thunder is refracted through the troposphere. This refraction results in spaces through which the thunder does not propagate. The sound of thunder often reflects off the Earth's surface. The rumbling sound is partly due to these reflections. This reflection and refraction can leave voids where thunder cannot be heard.

Earth's curvature also contributes to distant observers not hearing the thunderclap. Thunder is more likely to reflect off the Earth's surface before it reaches an observer far from the strike, and only the right refraction and reflection of the sound off of the atmosphere will give it the range it needs to be heard far away. The reflection and refraction in the troposphere determines who hears the strike and who doesn't. Usually, the troposphere will reflect the light, and leave out the sound - in these cases some fraction of the light emanating from distant thunderstorms (whose distant clouds may be so low to the horizon as to be essentially invisible) is scattered by the upper atmosphere and thus visible to remote observers.

See also
 Dry lightning
 Upper-atmospheric lightning
 Sprite lightning

References

Lightning
Electrical phenomena

de:Blitz#Wetterleuchten
fr:Orage de chaleur